Gurney Peak is a  spire-shaped peak in the Kichatna Mountains of the Alaska Range, in Denali National Park and Preserve, southwest of Denali. Caldwell and Shadows Glaciers originate from Gurney Peak.

See also
Mountain peaks of Alaska

References

Alaska Range
Mountains of Matanuska-Susitna Borough, Alaska
Denali National Park and Preserve
Mountains of Alaska